This article is the discography of American guitarist and singer-songwriter J. J. Cale.

Albums

Studio albums

Live albums

Collaborative albums

Soundtrack albums

Compilation albums

Video albums

Box sets

Repackaged sets

Singles

Contributions

Notes

References 

Discography
Discographies of American artists
Rock music discographies